Tupuzabad (also Romanized as Tūpūzābād; also known as Toppozābād) is a village in Beygom Qaleh Rural District, in the Central District of Naqadeh County, West Azerbaijan Province, Iran. At the 2006 census, its population was 549, in 142 families.

References 

Populated places in Naqadeh County